The 2018–19 Didi 10 competition is Georgian domestic rugby union competition operated by Georgian Rugby Union. One new team from I league was promoted to Didi 10 (Vepkhvebi) and Bagrati Kutaisi was relegated.

Teams 

 Lelo: Official site
 Aia: Official site
 Locomotive
 Kharebi
 Armazi
 Army
 Jiki
 Vepkhvebi
 Batumi
 Academy

Table 

<noinclude>

Playoffs
TBD

References

Rugby union leagues in Georgia (country)
Rugby union in Georgia (country)